The Monastery of Euthymius started as a lavra-type monastic settlement in the Judaean desert, founded by Saint Euthymius the Great (377–473) in 420, known as the Laura or Lavra of Euthymius. After its final abandonment in the 13th century, it was repurposed as a caravanserai and became known as Khan el-Ahmar, the Red Caravanserai, khan being an originally Persian word for inn or caravanserai. Its ruins still stand a short distance south of today's main Jerusalem-Jericho highway in the West Bank. 

It should not be confused with the nearby Khan al-Hatruri, better known to visitors as the Good Samaritan Inn, which sometimes also used to be called Khan al-Ahmar.

Monastery

Lavra of St Euthymius (428-473)
The church was consecrated by Juvenal, Bishop of Jerusalem on 7 May 428. The lavra, a cluster of cells for hermits around a church, was located in Adummim on the road from Jericho to Jerusalem and was based on the layout of the Pharan lavra, with small cells. The vita of the founder, also known as Euthymius of Lesser Armenia, mentions him living his first years as a monk in the Holy Land (406–11) at Pharan.

Byzantine cenobium after Euthymius
Following the death of Euthymius on 20 January 473 the church was converted to a refectory and a new church and cenobium were built above it. The cenobium was the area that novitiate monks would receive training prior to admittance to a lavra of the Sabaite tradition. The new church was consecrated by Martyrius, Patriarch of Jerusalem, in 482 and the site thereafter became known as the Monastery of St. Euthymius.

Early Muslim period
The lavra, ruined by an earthquake in 660, was rebuilt in a similar manner. Ancient testimonies speak of a Bedouin attack on the monastery in 796/97 as part of a series of such attacks against monasteries in Jerusalem and the Judean desert at the end of the 8th and beginning of the 9th century, but archaeology in general tends to paint a picture of peaceful abandonment, rather than destruction brought about by man or nature.

Crusader period
In 1106 Abbot Daniel noted: "To the east of the laura of St. Saba, only behind the mountain, is the Monastery of St. Euthymius, three versts away, and there lies St. Euthymius, and many other holy fathers lie there, and their bodies are as those of living people. There is a little monastery on a level place, and about it are rocky mountains some distance off. The monastery was established with a surrounding wall and the church was elevated. And there is quite close to it the Monastery of St. Theoctistus, under the mountain only half a day's walk from the Monastery of Euthymius, and all this has been destroyed now by pagans".

The monastic complex went through a massive restoration and construction phase in the 12th century during the Crusader period, but was finally abandoned in the next century.

Significance of the laura
The laura of Euthymius was essential in the advancement and organisation of the Sabaite (desert monastic) movement, and, as the only dyophysite monastery in the Judaean desert at the time of the Council of Chalcedon (451), was central to the development of Chalcedonian orthodoxy within Palestinian monasticism, in what was at first an almost completely anti-Chalcedonian, miaphysite Palestine.

Caravanserai (Khan al-Ahmar)

Mamluk period
After the abandonment of the monastery in the 13th century, during the Mamluk period, the structures were converted during the same century into a travellers' inn, known as Khan al-Ahmar, the "Red Khan", a caravanserai for Muslim pilgrims on the route between Jerusalem and Mecca via Nabi Musa. It should not be confused with nearby Khan al-Hatruri (aka Inn of the Good Samaritan), sometimes referred to as Khan al-Ahmar as well.

Ottoman period
The Rev. Haskett Smith guided European groups in Palestine in the late nineteenth century and edited the 1892 Murray's Handbooks for Travellers to Syria and Palestine. He recorded a visit to Khan al-Ahmar with a tour group journeying from Jerusalem to Jericho in his 1906 travelogue Patrollers of Palestine:

The entrance was through a wide archway in the side nearest to the road, and this archway opened into a covered courtyard with two similar arches at the further end, and doors leading into chambers on either side. Beyond the covered court was a spacious open square, surrounded on three sides by the high walls of the khan, and on the fourth bounded by the chambers and the court. A man in native costume was at one corner of the covered court, making coffee over a charcoal brazier, and at the same time filling and preparing a narghileh. There were several of these narghileh pipes arranged on a shelf near the brazier. The man was the innkeeper, or, as he is known by the natives, the khanidjeh. A few muleteers and other wayfarers were squatting or lying on the floor of the court, and some horses and mules were tethered in the open square within.

Access and tourism
The site is east of Mishor Adumim, the industrial zone of Ma'ale Adumim, and is accessible to visit.

See also
Monastery of Martyrius, a ruined Byzantine monastery in nearby Ma'ale Adumim
Mar Saba, the Holy Lavra of Saint Sabbas, a related Byzantine monastery (still working), also in the Judaean desert

References

Bibliography

 (p. 207)

External links
Euthymius Monastery at BibleWalks.com. Accessed April 2021.
Monastery of St. Euthymius (4 Eitam St, Ma'ale Adumim) at Google street view. Accessed April 2021.
Survey of Western Palestine, Map 18: at IAA archives (Israel Antiquities Authority) and Wikimedia commons

Christian monasteries in the West Bank
Archaeological sites in the West Bank
Christian monasteries established in the 5th century
Archaeological sites in the State of Palestine